Jayant Mistry (born 29 August 1966) is a retired British wheelchair tennis player of Indian descent who competed in international level events. He is a former British no.1 player in the singles and a former World no. 2 in the men's doubles. He competed at four Paralympic Games and was a semifinalist in the men's doubles at the 2000 Summer Paralympics.

He was the first British player to win the wheelchair men's doubles title at the 2005 Wimbledon Championships alongside Michaël Jeremiasz and the first British man to win a men's title at the Wimbledon Championships since Fred Perry in 1936, they were runner-ups at the 2006 Wimbledon Championships a year later.

Mistry was born with spina bifida and his left leg shorter than his right. He had his right foot amputated aged twelve and has a prosthetic.

References

External links
 
 

1966 births
Living people
English male tennis players
British male tennis players
British wheelchair tennis players
Paralympic wheelchair tennis players of Great Britain
Wheelchair tennis players at the 1992 Summer Paralympics
Wheelchair tennis players at the 1996 Summer Paralympics
Wheelchair tennis players at the 2000 Summer Paralympics
Wheelchair tennis players at the 2004 Summer Paralympics
Wimbledon champions
Sportspeople from Leicester
British people of Indian descent
Tennis people from Leicestershire